Kirkuk is a city in Iraq, serving as the capital of the Kirkuk Governorate, located  north of Baghdad. The city is home to a diverse population of Turkmens, Arabs and Kurds. Kirkuk sits on the ruins of the original Kirkuk Citadel which sits near the Khasa River.

Kirkuk was proclaimed the "capital of Iraqi culture" in 2010. It is also considered by Iraqi Turkmens to be their cultural and historical capital. The government of Iraq states that Kirkuk represents a small version of Iraq due to its diverse population, and that the city is a model for coexistence in the country.

Etymology
The ancient name of Kirkuk was the Hurrian Arrapha During the Parthian era, a Korkura/Corcura is mentioned by Ptolemy, which is believed to refer either to Kirkuk or to the site of Baba Gurgur  from the city. Since the Seleucid Empire it was known as Karkā d'Beṯ Ṣlōḥ, which means 'Citadel of the House of Seleucid' in Mesopotamian Aramaic, the lingua franca of the Fertile Crescent in that era.

The region around Kirkuk was known historically in the Eastern Aramaic and Syriac Assyrian sources as "Beth Garmai". The name "Beth Garmai" or "Beth Garme" may be of Syriac origin which meaning "the house of bones", which is thought to be a reference to bones of slaughtered Achaemenids after a decisive battle between Alexander the Great and Darius III on the plains between the Upper Zab and Diyala river. It was one of a number of independent Neo-Assyrian states which flourished during the Parthian empire (150 BC–226 AD).

It is also thought that region was known during the Parthian and Sassanid periods as Garmakan, which means the 'Land of Warmth' or the 'Hot Land'. In Persian "Garm" means warm;

After the 7th century, Muslim writers used the name Kirkheni (Syriac for "citadel") to refer to the city. Others used other variant, such as Bajermi (a corruption of Aramaic "B'th Garmayeh" or Jermakan (a corruption of Persian Garmakan) .

History

Ancient history
It is suggested that Kirkuk was one of the places occupied by Neanderthals based on archeological findings in the Shanidar Cave settlement. A large amount of pottery shards dating to the Ubaid period were also excavated from several Tells in the city.

Ancient Arrapkha was a part of Sargon of Akkad's Akkadian Empire (2335–2154 BC), and city was exposed to the raids of the Lullubi during Naram-Sin's reign.

Later the city was occupied around 2150 BC by language Isolate speaking Zagros Mountains dwellers who were known as the Gutian people by the Semitic and Sumerian of Mesopotamians. Arraphkha was the capital of the short-lived Guti kingdom (Gutium), before it was destroyed and the Gutians driven from Mesopotamia by the Neo-Sumerian Empire c. 2090 BC. Arrapkha became a part of the Old Assyrian Empire (c.2025–1750 BC), before Hammurabi briefly subjected Assyria to the short-lived Babylonian Empire, after which it again became a part of Assyria c.1725 BC.

However, by the middle of the 2nd millennium B.C. the Indo-Aryan Mittani of Anatolia formed a ruling class over the language isolate speaking Hurrians, and began to expand into a Hurri-Mitanni Empire. In the 1450s they attacked Assyria, sacking Assur, and bringing the cities of Gasur and Arrapkha under their control. From c.1450 to 1393 BC the kings of Assyria paid tribute to the kingdom of Mittani.

The Middle Assyrian Empire (1365–1020 BC) overthrew the Hurri-Mitanni in the mid 14th century BC and Arrapha once more became incorporated into Assyria proper. In the 11th and 10th centuries BC the city rose to prominence, becoming an important city in Assyria until the fall of the Neo-Assyrian Empire (911–605 BC).
 
The Hurri-Mitanni domination of Assyria was broken in the 1390s BC, and Arrapkha once more became an integral part of Assyria with the Middle Assyrian Empire (1365–1020 BC) which saw the Hurrian population driven from the region. It remained as such throughout the Neo-Assyrian Empire (911–605 BC) where it became an important Assyrian city.

After the fall of Assyria between 612 and 599 BC it was still an integral part of the geo-political province of Assyria – Achaemenid Assyria, Athura, Seleucid Syria, Assyria (Roman province) and Assuristan. In the Parthian and Sassanid eras Kirkuk was capital of the small Assyrian state of Beth Garmai (c.160 BC–250 AD).

The city briefly came to be part of the short-lived Median Empire before falling to the Achaemenid Empire (546–332 BC) where it was incorporated into the province of Athura (Achaemenid Assyria).

Later it became part of the Macedonian Empire (332–312 BC) and succeeding Seleucid Empire (311–150 BC) before falling to the Parthian Empire (150 BC–224 AD) as a part of Athura. The Parthians seemed to only exercise loose control, and a number of small Neo-Assyrian kingdoms sprang up in the region between the 2nd century BC and 4th century AD, one such kingdom named  "ܒܝܬܓܪܡܝ", (that is Bit Garmai in Syriac) had Arrapha as its capital. Christianity also arose during this period, with Arrapha and its surrounds being influenced by the Assyrian Church of the East. The Sassanid Empire destroyed these kingdoms during 3rd and early 4th centuries AD, and Arrapha was incorporated into Sassanid ruled Assuristan (Sassanid Assyria).

In AD 341, the Zoroastrian Shapur II ordered the massacre of all Assyrian Christians in the Persian Sassanid Empire. During the persecution, about 1,150 were martyred in Arrapha. The city appears on the Peutinger Map of this time. The city remained a part of the Sassanid Empire until the Islamic conquest in the mid 7th century AD.

Islamic Conquests of Mesopotamia
Arab Muslims fought the Sassanid empire in the 7th century AD, conquering the region. The city was a part of the Islamic Caliphate until the tenth century. Kirkuk and the surrounding areas were then ruled by the Hasanwayhid Kurds & Annazid Kurds from 1014 to 1120 AD, then it was taken over by Seljuk Turks for many years. After the divided empire collapsed, the city came under the Abbasids rule once again Suleiman Shah who was the governor of the city until it was taken over by Mongols in 1258. After the Mongol invasion, the Ilkhanate was founded in the region and the city became a part of it. The Ilkhanid rule ended when in 1336, the Ardalan took over the city, despite being vassals themselves of the various in Persia centred succeeding Turkic federations in the region, namely that of the Qara Qoyunlu, and the Aq Qoyunlu specifically. After the Battle of Chaldiran in 1514 the city came under the Soran Emirate control until it was taken over by Babanids in 1694. In 1851 it became under direct control of the Ottoman Empire. Ottoman rule continued until World War I when the Ottomans were pushed out of the region by the British Empire.

British occupation
At the end of World War I, the British occupied Kirkuk on 7 May 1918. Abandoning the city after about two weeks, the British returned to Kirkuk a few months later after the Armistice of Mudros. Kirkuk avoided the troubles caused by the Kurdish nationalist Mahmud Barzanji, who quickly attempted to overthrow the British Mandate in Iraq and establish his own fiefdom in Sulaymaniyah.

Entry into the Kingdom of Iraq
As both Turkey and Great Britain desperately wanted control of the Vilayet of Mosul (of which Kirkuk was a part), the Treaty of Lausanne in 1923 failed to solve the issue. For this reason, the question of Mosul was sent to the League of Nations. A committee travelled to the area before coming to a final decision: the territory south of the "Brussels line" belonged to Iraq. By the Treaty of Angora of 1926, Kirkuk became a part of the Kingdom of Iraq.

Discovery of oil

In 1927, Iraqi and American drillers working for the foreign-owned and British-led Iraq Petroleum Company (IPC) struck a huge oil gusher at Baba Gurgur ("St. Blaze" or father blaze in Kurdish) near Kirkuk. The IPC began exports from the Kirkuk oil field in 1934. The Company moved its headquarters from Tuz Khormatu to a camp on the outskirts of Kirkuk, which they named Arrapha after the ancient city. Arrapha remains a large neighborhood in Kirkuk to this day. The IPC exercised significant political power in the city and played a central role in Kirkuk's urbanization, initiating housing and development projects in collaboration with Iraqi authorities in the 1940s and 1950s.

The presence of the oil industry had an effect on Kirkuk's demographics. The exploitation of Kirkuk's oil, which began around 1930, attracted both Arabs and Kurds to the city in search of work. Kirkuk, which had been a predominantly Iraqi Turkmen city, gradually lost its uniquely Turkmen character. At the same time, large numbers of Kurds from the mountains were settling in the uninhabited but cultivable rural parts of the district of Kirkuk. The influx of Kurds into Kirkuk continued through the 1960s. According to the 1957 census, Kirkuk city was 37.63% Iraqi Turkmen, 33.26% Kurdish with Arabs and Assyrians making up less than 23% of its population.

Some analysts believe that poor reservoir-management practices during the Saddam Hussein years may have seriously, and even permanently, damaged Kirkuk's oil field.  One example showed an estimated  of excess fuel oil being reinjected. Other problems include refinery residue and gas-stripped oil. Fuel oil reinjection has increased oil viscosity at Kirkuk making it more difficult and expensive to get the oil out of the ground.

Over all, between April 2003 and late December 2004 there were an estimated 123 attacks on Iraqi energy infrastructures, including the country's 7,000 km-long pipeline system. In response to these attacks, which cost Iraq billions of US dollars in lost oil-export revenues and repair costs, the US military set up the Task Force Shield to guard Iraq's energy infrastructure and the Kirkuk-Ceyhan Oil Pipeline in particular. In spite of the fact that little damage was done to Iraq's oil fields during the war itself, looting and sabotage after the war ended was highly destructive and accounted for perhaps eighty percent of the total damage.

The discovery of vast quantities of oil in the region after World War I provided the impetus for the annexation of the former Ottoman Vilayet of Mosul (of which the Kirkuk region was a part), to the Iraqi Kingdom, established in 1921. Since then and particularly from 1963 onwards, there have been continuous attempts to transform the ethnic make-up of the region.

Pipelines from Kirkuk run through Turkey to Ceyhan on the Mediterranean Sea and were one of the two main routes for the export of Iraqi oil under the Oil-for-Food Programme following the Gulf War of 1991. This was in accordance with a United Nations mandate that at least 50% of the oil exports pass through Turkey. There were two parallel lines built in 1977 and 1987.

Kurdish autonomy and Arabization
In 1970 the Iraqi government reached an agreement with Kurdish leader Mustafa Barzani called the March Agreement of 1970, but the question of whether the oil-rich province of Kirkuk would be included within the Kurdish autonomous region remained unresolved, pending a new census.

Despite the signing of the March Agreement, relations between the Kurds and Iraqi government continued to deteriorate due to the unresolved status of Kirkuk, and there were two attempts to assassinate Barzani in 1972. In response to Barzani's continued demands during the early 1970s for Kirkuk to be recognized as part of the autonomous region under the terms of the March Agreement, settlement construction for newly arrived Arab families increased drastically as the Ba'athist government implemented Arabization policies to increase the Arab population of Kirkuk. Kurds were forbidden from buying property in Kirkuk, and could sell their properties only to Arabs. They were denied permission to renovate properties in need of maintenance, and poor Shi'a Arab families were paid to move to Kirkuk, while Kurds were paid to move out.

Negotiations between Barzani's Kurdish Democratic Party and the Iraqi government collapsed in March 1974 and Barzani rejected President Ahmed Hassan al-Bakr declaration of Kurdish autonomy. Many disputes persisted between the Kurds and Arabs and the conflict escalated into the Second Iraqi–Kurdish War (also called the Barzani rebellion). The rebellion collapsed after Iran withdrew its support for Barzani's forces following the 1975 Algiers Agreement and the Ba'ath regime intensified Arabization efforts.

After Barzani's rebellion was defeated in 1974, the districts of Chemchemal and Kelar, which had been part of Kirkuk, became part of Sulaymaniyah and Kifri became part of Diyala province. Other Arab-populated districts, like Zab, became part of Kirkuk. Kurds, Turkmen and Christian populations were forcibly relocated and replaced with Shi'a from Iraq's south. The expulsions continued after the 1991 uprisings. Kurdish villages were razed and thousands of new homes were built, including at least 200 homes for relatives of Iraqi soldiers killed during the Iran-Iraq War. Between 1968, when the Ba'ath Party first rose to power in Iraq, and 2003 between 200,000 and 300,000 persons were forcibly relocated out of Kirkuk. According to the Iraqi Ministry of Planning, by August 2005 (during the Iraq War), approximately 224,544 Kurds had returned to Kirkuk and 52,973 Arab persons had left the city.

Nationalization of Iraqi Petroleum Company
In 1972 the Iraqi government, led by then Vice-President Saddam Hussein, nationalized the Iraqi Petroleum Company (IPC), after being unable to reach an agreement that would increase oil exports and resolve a longstanding dispute over Law 80 of 1961. The Iraqi government began to sell its oil to Eastern bloc countries and the IPC's French partner CFP. After reaching an agreement with the Iraqis in 1973, the IPC members were able to retain some of their interests in southern Iraq through the Basra Petroleum Company but had lost Iraq's main oilfields, including the Kirkuk field.

Gulf War
In 1991, Saddam Hussein invaded Kuwait and was quickly routed by the United States in the First Gulf War (also called Operation Desert Storm). In the aftermath of the Iraqi army's defeat, rebellions broke out in Iraq; first in southern Iraq on March 1, and in the northern Kurdish region a few days later. By March 24, Kurdish Peshmerga forces had seized control of Kirkuk, but they were only able to hold it until March 28 when it was reclaimed by Hussein's forces. The US and UK began to enforce a no-fly zone in Northern Iraq and a de facto Kurdish Autonomous region emerged in the North. Arabs families were expelled from the Kurdish region and relocated to Kirkuk, which was still controlled by the Iraqi government. In these circumstances, Hussein's government further intensified the decades long policy of Arabization in Kirkuk, requiring that Kurds, Turkmen and Assyrians fill out "ethnic identity correction" forms and register as Arabs and many who refused to comply were forcibly relocated north of the Green Line. In May 1991, Massoud Barzani announced that Baghdad had conceded Kirkuk as the capital of the autonomous region, but when the Iraqi government demanded the Kurds join the Ba'athist government the dispute once again escalated to violent conflict and in October 1991 Iraqi forces had withdrawn from several Kurdish provinces in the North including Erbil, Dohuk and Sulaymaniyah.

Iraq War (2003–2011) and return of displaced Kurds 

American and British military forces led an invasion of Iraq in March 2003, marking the start the of Second Iraq War. Kurdish peshmerga fighters assisted in the 2003 capture of Kirkuk. Though the peshmerga were allowed to operate even after the Coalition Provisional Authority (CPA) disbanded and outlawed most of the armed militias in Iraq, the peshmerga were eventually asked to withdraw from Kirkuk and other Kurdish held provinces.

Under the supervision of chief executive of Coalition Provisional Authority L. Paul Bremer, a convention was held on 24 May 2003 to select the first City Council in the history of this oil-rich, ethnically divided city. Each of the city's four major ethnic groups was invited to send a 39-member delegation from which they would be allowed to select six to sit on the City Council. Another six council members were selected from among 144 delegates to represent independents social groups such as teachers, lawyers, religious leaders and artists.

Kirkuk's 30 members council is made up of five blocs of six members each. Four of those blocs are formed along ethnic lines—Kurds, Arabs, Assyrian and Turkmen—and the fifth is made up of independents which meant 10 more council seats given to two main Kurdish Parties by Paul Bremer as token of appreciation for cooperation with American Forces. Turkmen and Arabs complained that the Kurds allegedly hold five of the seats in the independent block. They were also infuriated that their only representative at the council's helm was an assistant mayor whom they considered pro-Kurdish. Abdul Rahman Mustafa, a Baghdad-educated lawyer was elected mayor by 20 votes to 10. The appointment of an Arab, Ismail Ahmed Rajab Al Hadidi, as deputy mayor went some way towards addressing Arab concerns.

On 30 June 2005, through a secret direct voting process, with the participation of the widest communities in the province and despite all the political legal security complexities of this process in the country generally and in Kirkuk in particular, Kirkuk witnessed the birth of its first elected Provincial Council. The Independent Electoral Commission of Iraq IECI approved the elections and announced the outcome of this process, which filled the 41 seats of Kirkuk Provincial Council as follows:
 26 seats 367 List Kirkuk Brotherhood List KBL
 8 seats 175 List Iraqi Turkmen Front ITF
 5 seats 299 List Iraqi Republic Gathering
 1 seats 178 List Turkmen Islamic Coalition
 1 seats 289 List Iraqi National Gathering

The new Kirkuk Provincial Council started its second turn on 6 March 2005. Its inaugural session was dedicated to the introduction of its new members, followed by an oath ceremony supervised by Judge Thahir Hamza Salman, the Head of Kirkuk Appellate Court.

Kirkuk is located in a disputed area of Iraq that runs from Sinjar on the Syrian border southeast to Khanaqin and Mandali on the Iranian border. Kirkuk has been a disputed territory for around eighty years — Kurds wanted Kirkuk to become part of the Kurdistan Region, which has been opposed by the region's Arab and Turkmen populations.

The Kurds sought to annex the long disputed territory to the Kurdistan Regional Government (KRG) through Article 140 of the Iraqi Constitution that was enacted in 2005. Under Article 140 the Ba'athist Arabization policy would be reversed: Displaced Kurds who had relocated to areas in the Kurdish autonomous region would return to Kirkuk, while the Arab Shi'a population would be compensated and relocated to areas in the south. After the Ba'athist regimes demographic and redistricting policies were undone a census and referendum would determine whether Kirkuk would be administered by the KRG or Baghdad.

Following the 2010 parliamentary election the Kurds signed the Erbil Agreement and backed Nouri al-Maliki on the condition that Article 140 would be implemented.

Violence after U.S. withdrawal

Three churches in Kirkuk were targeted with bombs in August 2011. On 12 July 2013, Kirkuk was hit by a deadly bomb, killing 38 people in an attack on a café. A few days prior, on 11 July 2013, over 40 people were killed in a series of bombings and shootings across Iraq, including in Kirkuk.

Kurdish control (2014–2017)
On 12 June 2014, following the 2014 Northern Iraq offensive of the Islamic State, during which it secured control of Tikrit and nearby areas in Syria, the Iraqi army retreated from their positions in Kirkuk and the Peshmerga of the Kurdistan Regional Government then took the city.

On 21 October 2016, the Islamic State launched multiple attacks in Kirkuk to divert Iraqi military resources during the Battle of Mosul. Witnesses reported multiple explosions and gun battles in the city, most centered on a government compound. At least 11 workers, including several Iranians, were killed by a suicide bomber at a power plant in nearby Dibis. The attack was brought to an end by 24 October, with 74 militants being killed and others (including the leader) being arrested.

Kurdification
Under Kurdish control, Turkmen and Arab residents in Kirkuk experienced intimidation, harassment and were forced to leave their homes, in order to increase the Kurdish demographic in Kirkuk and bolster their claims to the city. Multiple Human Rights Watch reports detail the confiscation of Turkmen and Arab families' documents, preventing them from voting, buying property and travelling. Turkmen residents of Kirkuk were detained by Kurdish forces and compelled to leave the city. Kurdish authorities expelled hundreds of Arab families from the city, demolishing their homes in the process.

United Nations reports since 2006 have documented that Kurdish authorities and Peshmerga militia forces were illegally policing Kirkuk and other disputed areas, and that these militia have abducted Turkmen and Arabs, subjecting them to torture.

Battle of Kirkuk (2017)
On 16 October 2017, the Iraqi national army and PMF militia retook control of Kirkuk as the Peshmerga forces fled the city without fighting.

Kirkuk has been a disputed territory for around eighty years. The KRG wanted Kirkuk to become part of the Kurdistan Region, which is opposed by the region's Arab and Turkmen populations.

There has been a long planned referendum to resolve Kirkuk's status under Article 140 of the Iraqi Constitution.

Demographics
Kirkuk's population was predominantly Turkmen in the early 20th century, when Turkish was the most common language spoken at home. The city had a population near 30,000 in the late 1910s. The Turkmen were majority in the city centre, dominating the political and economic life of the area.

The most reliable census concerning the ethnic composition of Kirkuk dates back to 1957. The Turkish-speaking Turkmen formed the majority in the city of Kirkuk, whilst the Kurds were the plurality in the governorate. The provincial borders were later altered, the province was renamed al-Ta'mim, and some Kurdish-majority districts were added to Erbil and Sulamaniya provinces.

A report by the International Crisis Group points out that figures from the 1977 and 1997 censuses "are all considered highly problematic, due to suspicions of regime manipulation" because Iraqi citizens were only allowed to indicate belonging to either the Arab or Kurdish ethnic groups; consequently, this skewed the number of other ethnic minorities. Many Iraqi Turkmen declared themselves as Arabs (because the Kurds were not desirable under Saddam Hussein's regime), reflecting the changes wrought by Arabisation.

Ethnic groups

After attacks by ISIS, Kurdish authorities who were suspicious of the Arab refugees in Kirkuk, expelled hundreds of Arab families who had fled to the region during Iraq's war against ISIS. The refugees were sent to camps for the displaced or to their places of origin. Some of the displaced described themselves as locals and not as internally displaced.

Armenians 
In 2017, around 30 Armenian families resided in the city. The community has also an Armenian Apostolic church.

Assyrians
The Assyrians have an ancient history in Kirkuk, as they do throughout northern Iraq. As Arrapha it was a part of the Old Assyrian Empire (c.1975–1750 BC), and fully incorporated into Assyria proper by the 14th century BC during the Middle Assyrian Empire (1365–105 BC), and remained so until the downfall of the Neo-Assyrian Empire between 615 and 599 BC. After this it was an integral part of Achaemenid Assyria (Athura), and during the Parthian Empire was centre to an independent Neo Assyrian state named Beth Garmai, before being incorporated into Assuristan by the Sassanid Empire.

The Seleucid town, like many other Upper Mesopotamian cities had a significant indigenous Assyrian population. Christianity was established among them in the 2nd century by the bishop Tuqrītā (Theocritos).
During the Sasanian times the town became an important centre of the Assyrian Church of the East, with several of its bishops rising to the rank of Patriarch. Tensions among Christians and Zoroastrians led to a severe persecution of Christians during the reign of Shapur II (309–379 A.D.) as recorded in the Acts of the Persian Martyrs. Persecution resumed under Yazdegerd II in 445 A.D. who massacred thousands of them. Their situation greatly improved under the Sasanians in the following two centuries after the advent of a national Persian church of free of Byzantine influence, namely Nestorianism. Persecution resumed under Yazdegerd II in 445 A.D. who massacred thousands of them. Tradition puts the death toll at 12,000 among them the patriarch Shemon Bar Sabbae.
The city was known as the centre of the prosperous Ecclesiastical Province of Beth Garmai which lingered until the conquests of Timur Leng in 1400 A.D.
During the Ottoman period most of Kirkuk's Christians followed the Chaldean Catholic Church whose bishop resided in the Cathedral of the Great Martyrion which dates back to the 5th century. The cathedral was however used as a powder storage and was blown up as the Ottomans retreated in 1918.

The discovery of oil brought more Christians to Kirkuk, however they were also affected by the Arabization policy of the Baath Party. Their numbers continued to plummet after the American invasion, and they occupy 4% of municipal offices, a percentage thought to be representative of their numbers in the city.

Jews
Jews had a long history in Kirkuk. Ottoman records show that in 1560 there were 104 Jewish homes in Kirkuk, and in 1896 there were 760 Jews in the city. After World War I, the Jewish population increased, especially after Kirkuk became a petroleum center; in 1947 there were 2,350 counted in the census.  Jews were generally engaged in commerce and handicraft.  Social progress was slow, and it was only in the 1940s that some Jewish students acquired secondary academic education.  By 1951 almost all of the Jews had left for Israel.

Kurds

Kirkuk is claimed by the Kurdistan Regional Government as its capital, but they do not control the city or province, nor is Kirkuk officially part of the Kurdistan Region. 

The Baban family was a Kurdish family that, in the 18th and 19th centuries, dominated the political life of the province of Sharazor, in present-day Iraqi Kurdistan. The first member of the clan to gain control of the province and its capital, Kirkuk, was Sulayman Beg. Enjoying almost full autonomy, the Baban family established Kirkuk as their capital. It was from this time that Kurds in Iraq began to view Kirkuk as their capital. This persisted even after the Babans moved their administration to the new town of Sulaymaniya, named after the dynasty's founder, in the late 18th century. according to the Ottoman encyclopedist Shamsaddin Sami , author of Qamus al-A'lam published in Istanbul in 1897, describes the demography of Kirkuk in this way: “The Kurds represent three quarters of the population. The remaining quarter is made up of Turcomans , Arabs and others. There are also 760 Jews and 500 Assyrian-Chaldeans living there."

Turkmens

Iraqi Turkmens view the city as their capital, with the last reliable census showing the city of Kirkuk had a Turkmen majority.

In the city of Kirkuk, Turkmens reside in the neighborhoods of Tisin, Musalla, Korya, Baghdad Road, Sarıkahya, Şaturlu, Beyler, Piryadi, Almas, Arafa, Bulak, Çukur, İmam Abbas, Cırıt Square, Çay, 1 June and Beşiktaş. They are sparsely dispersed in other neighborhoods. It is also known that Christian Turkmens live in the neighborhoods of Şaturlu, Almas and Arafa in Kirkuk. There are many Turkmen villages around Kirkuk. These villages include Türkalan, Yayçı, Çardaklı, Kızılyar, Kümbetler, Bulova and Beşir.

The riverfront, the historical homes, alleyways, the old cemeteries, and the prevailing musical modes of Kirkuk historically belong to the Turkmen. The old names of most of the villages and districts in Kirkuk, as well as the prevalent trades and occupations, trace back to Turkmen families. 

The Turkmen/Turkoman are descendants of numerous Turkic migration waves. The earliest arrivals date back to the Umayyads and Abbasid eras, when they arrived as military recruits. Considerable Turcoman settlement continued during the Seljuq era when Toghrul entered Iraq in 1055 with his army composed mostly of Oghuz Turks. Kirkuk remained under the control of the Seljuq Empire for 63 years. However, the largest Turkic migration waves occurred during the four centuries of Ottoman rule (1535–1919) when Turkish migrants from Anatolia were encouraged to settle in the region; indeed, it is largely from this period that modern Turkmens claim association with Anatolia and the modern Turkish state.

In particular, following the conquest of Iraq by the Ottoman sultan Suleiman the Magnificent in 1535, Kirkuk came firmly under Ottoman control and was referred to “Gökyurt” (Blue Homeland) in the Ottoman records, "perhaps indicating that Kirkuk was identified as a particularly Turkic town by that time." Under the Ottomans, Turkish migrations from Anatolia to Kirkuk occurred throughout the centuries; firstly during the initial conquest of 1535, followed by the arrival of Turkish families with the army of sultan Murad IV in 1638, whilst others came later with other notable Ottoman figures. These families occupied the highest socioeconomic strata and held the most important bureaucratic jobs until the end of Ottoman rule. During this period, the Turcoman were the predominant population of Kirkuk city and its close environs but Kurds constituted the majority of the rural population of Kirkuk. Kirkuk had a population near 30,000 in the late 1910s, Turkmens were majority in the city center, dominating the political and economic life of the area.

Currently Iraqi Turkmen politicians hold just over 20 percent of seats on Kirkuk's city council, while Turkmen leaders say they make up nearly a third of the city.

Main sites
Ancient architectural monuments of Kirkuk include:
 the Kirkuk Citadel
 the Qishla of Kirkuk
 the Prophet Daniel's Tomb
 Qaysareyah of Kirkuk

The archaeological sites of Qal'at Jarmo and Yorgan Tepe are found at the outskirts of the modern city. In 1997, there were reports that the government of Saddam Hussein "demolished Kirkuk's historic citadel with its mosques and ancient church".

The architectural heritage of Kirkuk sustained serious damage during World War I (when some pre-Muslim Assyrian Christian monuments were destroyed) and, more recently, during the Iraq War. Simon Jenkins reported in June 2007 that "eighteen ancient shrines have been lost, ten in Kirkuk and the south in the past month alone".

Geography

Climate 
Kirkuk experiences a hot semi-arid climate (Köppen climate classification: BSh) with extremely hot and dry summers and mild winters with moderate rainfall. Snow is rare but it fell on 22 February 2004, and from 10 to 11 January 2008.

Notable people

See also
 List of largest cities of Iraq
 Chaldean Catholic Archeparchy of Kirkuk-Sulaimaniya
Kirkuk Massacre of 1924
 Operation Fath 1
 Arabization
Kurdification

Notes

References

Further reading
Published in the 19th century
 
 

Published in the 20th century
 
 

Published in the 21st century

External links

 Iraq Image – Kirkuk Satellite Observation
 Human Rights Watch Report: Kurdish Autonomy and Arabization, 1993
 Human Rights Developments in Government-controlled Iraq, 2001
 IRAQ: PEOPLE COME FIRST, 2003
 International Humanitarian Law Issues In A Potential War In Iraq, 2003
 Amnesty International Report: Decades of human rights abuse in Iraq, 2003
 Reversing Arabization of Kirkuk, 2004
 Iraq: In Kurdistan, Land Disputes Fuel Unrest, 2004
 German-kurdish homepage for politics and culture
 Insurgents stir up strife in Kirkuk
 Kurds flee Iraqi town, 15 March 2003; named Kurds' preferred capital
 Key Targets in Iraq, Anthony H. Cordesman, CSIS, February 1998; information about the oil resources and facilities
 Brief Summary of Kirkuk History
 Kirkuk in Old Ages
 Numerous research about Kirkuk

 
Cities in Iraq
District capitals of Iraq
Populated places in Kirkuk Governorate
Ancient Assyrian cities
Turkmen communities in Iraq
Populated places established in the 3rd millennium BC
Kurdish settlements in Iraq
Assyrian communities in Iraq